Four Elms is a village within the civil parish of Hever in the Sevenoaks District of Kent, England. The village is located on a crossroads between Edenbridge and Sevenoaks, two miles (3.2 km) northeast of the former place.

The church, part of a united benefice with Hever and Markbeech, is dedicated to St Paul.

The film sound recordist Peter Handford was born here.

External links

Parish Council
The three churches
Four Elms Village

 

Villages in Kent